The Sasanian dynasty was the house that founded the Sasanian Empire, ruling this empire from 224 to 651 AD in Persia (modern-day Iran). It began with Ardashir I, who named the dynasty as Sasanian in honour of his grandfather (or father), Sasan, and after the name of his tribe.

The Shahanshah was the sole regent, head of state and head of government of the empire. At times, power shifted de facto to other officials, namely the spahbed. Upon the empire's conquest by the Islamic caliphate in 651, members of the imperial family fled in exile to China following the death of Yazdegerd III, where they would become accepted as members of the imperial court by Emperor Gaozong of Tang. Although there would be numerous attempts to invade Islamic Persia with Chinese support, this branch of Sasanids would remain in China indefinitely. Narsieh, grandson of Yazdegerd and last recorded Sasanid in China, would adopt the surname Li (李) in honor of the Chinese imperial family.

The Sasanian monarchs claimed descent from the Kayanids, a legendary Persian dynasty mentioned in the Avesta, the sacred texts of Zoroastrianism, which is commonly thought to be based upon the late Achaemenid dynasty. As such, Dara II, the Kayanid king Sasan supposedly traced his lineage to, was most likely based upon Darius III, whose empire was conquered by Alexander the Great just like Dara's. Another differing account exists in Kar-Namag i Ardashir i Pabagan, in which Ardashir is presented as the son of Sasan, a descendant of Darius III, and an unnamed daughter of Pabag, a feudal ruler in Persis. However, these conflicting accounts led some historians, like Touraj Daryaee, to believe that Ardashir simply claimed descent from anyone who was most convenient for him. Relating Ardashir to the legendary Kayanians with the nickname Kay, besides connecting himself to Sasan, a guardian deity, and also to Dara, which is possibly a combination of Darius I and Darius III the Achaemenid, hints at a possible attempt to claim lineage from the Achaemenids. Additionally, the name "Sasan" was thought to be composed of the epigraphic form "Ssn" on wares and other documents, implying that Sasan was based on a Zoroastrian deity, though he is not mentioned in the Avesta or any other Iranian texts. Martin Schwartz has recently shown that the deity shown on the pottery wares is not related to Sasan, but shows Ssn, an old Semitic goddess that was worshiped in Ugarit in the second millennium BC. The word "Sasa" is written on coins found in Taxila; it is probably related to "Sasan", since the symbols on the coins are similar to the coins of Shapur I, son of Ardashir. Ferdowsi's Shahnameh remarks that Sasan's Oriental lineage might imply that his house had come from the Orient, presumably India. With all this in mind, it can be assumed that Ardashir claimed his lineage to be divine and the Sasanians may have raised Sasan's rank to that of a god's.

See also
 List of shahanshahs of the Sasanian Empire
 Sasanian family tree
 Sasanian architecture

References

Sources
 
 
 

 
Iranian noble families